T. alba  may refer to:
 Tabebuia alba or Tecoma alba, now known as Handroanthus albus, the ipê-amarelo-da-serra or golden trumpet tree, a tree species native to Cerrado vegetation in Brazil
 Tyto alba, the barn owl, an owl species and one of the most widespread of all birds

See also
 Alba (disambiguation)